Conjunctive grammars are a class of formal grammars
studied in formal language theory.
They extend the basic type of grammars,
the context-free grammars,
with a conjunction operation.
Besides explicit conjunction,
conjunctive grammars allow implicit disjunction
represented by multiple rules for a single nonterminal symbol,
which is the only logical connective expressible in context-free grammars.
Conjunction can be used, in particular,
to specify intersection of languages.
A further extension of conjunctive grammars
known as Boolean grammars
additionally allows explicit negation.

The rules of a conjunctive grammar are of the form

where  is a nonterminal and
, ..., 
Informally, such a rule asserts that 
every string  over 
that satisfies each of the syntactical conditions represented

Formal definition 
A conjunctive grammar  is defined by the 4-tuple  where
  is a finite set; each element  is called a nonterminal symbol or a variable. Each variable represents a different type of phrase or clause in the sentence. Variables are also sometimes called syntactic categories.
The set of terminals is the alphabet of the language defined by the grammar .
  is the start variable (or start symbol), used to represent the whole sentence (or program).

It is common to list all right-hand sides for the same left-hand side on the same line, using | (the pipe symbol) to separate them.

Two equivalent formal definitions
of the language specified by a conjunctive grammar exist.
One definition is based upon representing the grammar
as a system of language equations with union, intersection and concatenation
and considering its least solution.
The other definition generalizes
Chomsky's generative definition of the context-free grammars
using rewriting of terms over conjunction and concatenation.

Definition by derivation

The language of a grammar  is the set of all strings it generates.

Example 
The grammar , with productions
 
,
,
,
,
,

is conjunctive. A typical derivation is 
 
It can be shown that . The language is not context-free, proved by the pumping lemma for context-free languages.

Parsing algorithms
Though the expressive power of conjunctive grammars
is greater than those of context-free grammars,
conjunctive grammars retain some of the latter.
Most importantly, there are generalizations of the main context-free parsing algorithms,
including the linear-time recursive descent,
the cubic-time generalized LR,
the cubic-time Cocke-Kasami-Younger,
as well as Valiant's algorithm running as fast as matrix multiplication.

Theoretical properties
A property that is undecidable already for context-free languages or finite intersections of them, must be undecidable also for conjunctive grammars; these include: 
emptiness, finiteness, regularity, context-freeness, inclusion and equivalence.

The family of conjunctive languages is closed under union, intersection, concatenation and Kleene star, but not under string homomorphism, prefix, suffix, and substring.
Closure under complement and under ε-free string homomorphism are still open problems (as of 2001).

The expressive power of grammars over a one-letter alphabet has been researched.

This work provided a basis
for the study of language equations of a more general form.

Synchronized alternating pushdown automata 
Aizikowitz and Kaminski introduced a new class of pushdown automata (PDA) called synchronized alternating pushdown automata (SAPDA). They proved it to be equivalent to conjunctive grammars in the same way as nondeterministic PDAs are equivalent to context-free grammars.

Notes

References

External links
 
 
 
  
  Technical report version (pdf)

Formal languages